Damián Ariel Escudero (born 20 April 1987) is an Argentine professional footballer who plays as a left midfielder. 

He was a well-travelled professional, playing for a number of clubs in Argentina, Spain, Mexico and Brazil after starting out at Vélez Sarsfield.

Escudero was an Argentina youth international.

Club career
Escudero was born in Rosario, Santa Fe. A product of Club Atlético Vélez Sarsfield's youth system, he made his first-team debut in a 0–1 away defeat against Newell's Old Boys on 4 March 2006. He found himself at the centre of a controversy at the end of the year, when the club refused to release him and Mauro Zárate for the 2007 South American Youth Championship.

When the 2007 edition of the Copa Libertadores started, Escudero was already a dynamic part in the team's attacking movements. He helped Vélez reach the round-of-16 in the tournament, scoring four goals.

Escudero had an irregular 2007–08 season, during which his team failed to qualify for the Copa Sudamericana. However, he did net three times in the Clausura, including once against Boca Juniors.

For 2008–09, Escudero was bought by Spanish La Liga side Villarreal CF in a US$12,000,000 move. He was quickly loaned to Real Valladolid because his club's non-EU quota was already full, appearing rarely throughout the campaign due to injury.

Escudero returned to Villarreal for 2009–10, but continued to be barred by the likes of Robert Pires and Santi Cazorla. Most of his appearances were due to injury problems to the latter, and he scored against Xerez CD on 14 March 2010 (2–0 home win) after only playing six minutes in the game.

In June 2010, Escudero was sold to Boca Juniors, with Villarreal retaining 50% of the player's rights. The following year he was loaned to Grêmio Foot-Ball Porto Alegrense and performed solidly but, after the two clubs could not agree on a transfer fee for another loan, he returned to Buenos Aires.

In January 2012, Escudero returned to Brazil signing a one-year contract with Clube Atlético Mineiro, who paid Boca US$700.000. Apart from a one-year spell in the Mexican Liga MX with Puebla F.C. he continued to play in the country in the following years, with Esporte Clube Vitória, CR Vasco da Gama and Cuiabá Esporte Clube.

International career
In 2007, Escudero was selected in the Argentina under-20 squad to compete in the FIFA World Cup in Canada, but hardly played due to injury. The following year, he first played for the Olympic side against Guatemala in preparation for the 2008 Summer Olympics, appearing as a left back in the 5–0 rout.

Personal life
Escudero was often nicknamed Pichi, the same used by his father Osvaldo who was also a football player.

Honours

Club
Atlético Mineiro
Campeonato Mineiro: 2012

Vitória
Campeonato Baiano: 2013

Cuiabá
Copa Verde: 2019

International
Argentina
FIFA U-20 World Cup: 2007

References

External links
 Argentine League statistics 
 
 
 
 

1987 births
Living people
Footballers from Rosario, Santa Fe
Argentine footballers
Association football midfielders
Argentine Primera División players
Club Atlético Vélez Sarsfield footballers
Boca Juniors footballers
La Liga players
Villarreal CF players
Real Valladolid players
Campeonato Brasileiro Série A players
Campeonato Brasileiro Série B players
Grêmio Foot-Ball Porto Alegrense players
Clube Atlético Mineiro players
Esporte Clube Vitória players
CR Vasco da Gama players
Cuiabá Esporte Clube players
Liga MX players
Club Puebla players
Argentina under-20 international footballers
Argentine expatriate footballers
Expatriate footballers in Spain
Expatriate footballers in Brazil
Expatriate footballers in Mexico
Argentine expatriate sportspeople in Spain
Argentine expatriate sportspeople in Brazil
Argentine expatriate sportspeople in Mexico